La Quebrada is the capital of Urdaneta Municipality in the state of Trujillo in Venezuela.  The town is also sometimes called La Quebrada de San Roque. It is situated in a mountainous area and has cool weather all year long.  In the past, the primary income of the townspeople came from coffee plantations, but today all farming is dedicated to the cultivation of vegetables, fruits and flowers.  The houses are built in a Spanish colonial style on laderas or sloped lots, very well planned. 

Visitors come to participate in the series of local religious festivals during the year, which contribute to the town's lively, colorful feel. The most important feasts are the Patron Saint Feast (The Ascension of Mary and St. Roque) on August 15 and 16, the Holy Week and Christmas festivities which are performed live, The 'Paradura' of the Infant Jesus, St. Isidro and many others.  La Quebrada also features various tourist destinations and cultural sites such as the St. Roque Hotel, Nidal de Nubes Hotel, La Posada Hostel, the House of Culture, the Art and Graphic Workshop, the Public Library, the Spanish colonial main church, and the so-called 'La Capilla' where visitors can see the works of the Quebradan painter Ademar Gonzalez. The town has also a band (it is 100 years old) which performs every Saturday evening and on many other occasions during the year.

Populated places in Trujillo (state)